Chan King Yin (born 13 December 1982) is a windsurfer from Hong Kong, China, who won a gold medal at the 2006 Asian Games in the mistral light class. At the 2010 Asian Games, Chan earned his second Asian Games gold medal, in the mistral event.

External links
 
 
 
 

1982 births
Living people
Hong Kong windsurfers
Hong Kong male sailors (sport)
Olympic sailors of Hong Kong
Sailors at the 2008 Summer Olympics – RS:X
Asian Games gold medalists for Hong Kong
Asian Games bronze medalists for Hong Kong
Asian Games medalists in sailing
Sailors at the 2002 Asian Games
Sailors at the 2006 Asian Games
Sailors at the 2010 Asian Games
Medalists at the 2002 Asian Games
Medalists at the 2006 Asian Games
Medalists at the 2010 Asian Games
Place of birth missing (living people)
Alumni of Hong Kong Baptist University
21st-century Hong Kong people